The National Center for Data Mining (NCDM) is a center of the University of Illinois at Chicago (UIC), established in 1998 to serve as a resource for research, standards development, and outreach for high performance and distributed data mining and predictive modeling.

NCDM won the High Performance Bandwidth Challenge at SuperComputing '06 in Tampa, FL and recently demonstrated the use of UDP Data Transport.

External links
 National Center for Data Mining
 SC06 Bandwidth Challenge Results

University of Illinois Chicago